Hendrik Wolter (Henk) Broer (born 18 February 1950, Diever) is a Dutch mathematician known for contributions to the theory of nonlinear dynamical systems. He was professor at the University of Groningen between 1981 and 2015.

Biography 
Broer was granted a doctorate in the faculty of mathematics and natural sciences in 1979 under the supervision of Floris Takens for a thesis entitled Bifurcations of singularities in volume preserving vector fields.  He was a professor at the University of Groningen, the Netherlands, from 1981 till his retirement in 2015.  In 1985 he spent a semester as a guest professor of Boston University, Massachusetts. He is a long term member of the Royal Dutch Mathematical Society, serving as chairman from 2007 to 2009.

Awards and honors 
In 2008 Broer became a member of the Royal Netherlands Academy of Arts and Sciences and in 2015 he was made a Knight of the Order of the Netherlands Lion.

Books 
 1991. With F. Dumortier, S.J. van Strien and F.Takens. Structures in dynamics: finite dimensional deterministic studies. Studies in Mathematical Physics 2 North Holland
 1995. With J. van de Craats and F. Verhulst. Chaostheorie - Het einde van de voorspelbaarheid? Epsilon Uitgaven 35 [Reprinted as Het einde van de voorspelbarheid? Chaostheorie, ideeën en toepassingen. Aramith Uitgevers - Epsilon Uitgaven 35
 1996. With G.B. Huitema and M.B. Servryuk. Quasi-periodic tori in families of dynamical systems: order amidst chaos. Springer LNM 1645
 1999. Meetkunde en Fysica, met differentiaalvormen en integraalstellingen. Epsilon Uitgaven 44 
 2003. With I. Hoveijn, G.A. Lunter and G. Vegter. Bifurcations in Hamiltonian systems. Springer LNM 1806
 2011. With F.Takens, Dynamical Systems and Chaos. Epsilon Uitgaven 64; Appl. Math. Sciences 172, Springer-Verlag
 2013. Hemelverschijnselen nabij de horizon, naar Minnaert en Wegener, Bernoulli en Hamilton. Epsilon Uitgaven 77
2016. Near the horizon: an invitation to geometric optics. The Carus Mathematical Monographs 33 MAA

 Edited books 
 1990. With F. Verhulst. Dynamische systemen en chaos: een revolutie vanuit de wiskunde. Epsilon Uitgaven 14 
 2001. With B. Krauskopf and G. Vegter. Global Analysis of Dynamical Systems. Festschrift dedicated to Floris Takens for his 60th birthday. Institute of Physics Publishing 
 2005. With F. Dumortier, J. Mawhin, A. Vanderbauwhede and S.M. Verduyn Lunel. Equadiff 2003. Proceedings International Conference on Differential Equations, Hasselt 2003. World Scientific
 2010. With B. Hasselblatt and F. Takens. Handbook of Dynamical Systems.'' Volume 3. North Holland

References

External links 
 
 

1950 births
Living people
Dutch mathematicians
Members of the Royal Netherlands Academy of Arts and Sciences
Academic staff of the University of Groningen